Trinity Catholic College may refer to:

 Trinity Catholic College, Auburn, a school in Greater Western Sydney, New South Wales, Australia
 Trinity Catholic College, Dunedin, a school in Dunedin, New Zealand
 Trinity Catholic College, Goulburn, a school in New South Wales, Australia
 Trinity Catholic College, Lismore, a school in New South Wales, Australia
 Trinity Catholic College, Middlesbrough, a school in North Yorkshire, England

See also 

 Trinity Catholic School
 Trinity College (disambiguation)